Ossi Vilppunen (born 10 March 1936) is a Finnish footballer. He played in one match for the Finland national football team in 1957.

References

External links
 

1936 births
Living people
Finnish footballers
Finland international footballers
Place of birth missing (living people)
Association footballers not categorized by position